Sir John St Leger (died 1596), of Annery in Monkleigh, Devon, was an English landowner who served in local and national government.

Origins
He was the son of Sir George St Leger, of Annery, and his wife, Anne Knyvett, daughter of Sir Edmund Knyvett, of Buckenham, and his wife Eleanor Tyrrell. His paternal grandparents were Sir James St Leger and Lady Anne Butler, heiress of Annery, daughter of Thomas Butler, 7th Earl of Ormond and great-aunt of Queen Anne Boleyn. One of his great-uncles was Sir Thomas St Leger, the husband of Anne of York, Duchess of Exeter, sister of Kings Edward IV and Richard III.

Public career
Knighted in 1544 and Sheriff of Devon in 1560, he was Member of Parliament for Dartmouth, Devon, in 1555–1558, Devon in 1559–1563, Arundel, Sussex, in 1563–1571, Devon again in 1571–1583 and Tregony, Cornwall in 1584–1585.

Marriage and children
He married Catherine Nevill, daughter of George Nevill, 5th Baron Bergavenny and his third wife Lady Mary Stafford, youngest daughter of Edward Stafford, 3rd Duke of Buckingham and his wife Lady Eleanor Percy. Their children included:
John St Leger, said to be a soldier in Ireland, who died unmarried and in poverty
Mary St Leger, who married Sir Richard Grenville of Stowe in Kilkhampton, Cornwall, the famous captain of the Revenge, and was mother of Sir Bernard Grenville.
Frances St Leger, who married John Stucley (1551–1611), of Affeton in East Worlington, Devon and was the mother of Sir Lewis Stucley 
Margaret St Leger, who married Richard Bellew of Ash in Braunton, Devon. A monument to the couple survives in Braunton parish church.  
Eulalia St Leger, who married first Edmund Tremayne of Collacombe in Lamerton, Devon, who was Chief Secretary of Ireland, and secondly Tristram Arscott (1544–1621) of Tetcott, Devon, who bought Annery from his father-in-law.

Death
Despite accumulating much land, he became encumbered with debts and parted with many of his estates. He died "a poor man" and was buried on 8 October 1596 in the parish church of Monkleigh. On the death of his son John without children, the St Leger family of Annery was extinguished.

Sources
Virgoe, Roger, Biography of St Leger, Sir John (by 1516-93/96), of Annery, published in The History of Parliament: the House of Commons 1509-1558, ed. S.T. Bindoff, 1982
Fuidge, N.M., Biography of St Leger (Sellenger), Sir John (by 1516-93/96), of Annery, published in The History of Parliament: the House of Commons 1558-1603, ed. P.W. Hasler, 1981
 W. D. Pink, 'The Parliamentary History of Tregony', The Western Antiquary, Volume VI, Part V (1886), 117–121

References

1596 deaths
Year of birth missing
Members of the Parliament of England (pre-1707) for Devon
Members of the pre-1707 English Parliament for constituencies in Cornwall
16th-century births
English knights
High Sheriffs of Devon
English MPs 1555
English MPs 1559
English MPs 1563–1567
English MPs 1571
English MPs 1572–1583
English MPs 1584–1585
Members of the Parliament of England for Dartmouth
People from Ulcombe